Friction factor may refer to:

 Atkinson friction factor, a measure of the resistance to airflow of a duct
 Darcy friction factor, in fluid dynamics
 Fanning friction factor, a dimensionless number used as a local parameter in continuum mechanics

See also 
coefficient of friction

Dimensionless numbers